Miguel Rosales (born 1961 in Guatemala) is president and principal designer of Rosales + Partners, an architecture firm based in Boston, Massachusetts. He specializes in bridge aesthetics and design. Some examples of these bridges include; Phyllis J. Tilley Memorial Bridge, Christina and John Markey Memorial Pedestrian Bridge, and Liberty Bridge at Falls Park on the Reedy River.

Early life and education
Rosales was born in Guatemala City, Guatemala, where he received a degree in architecture at the Universidad Francisco Marroquin.  In 1985, he enrolled at the Massachusetts Institute of Technology (MIT) to study Urban and Environmental Design, obtaining a SMArchS (Master of Science in Architecture Studies) degree in 1987.

Career

Rosales initially worked with Swiss engineer and bridge designer Christian Menn, and from 1988 to 1996, Rosales served as the lead architect and urban designer for the Leonard P. Zakim Bunker Hill Bridge over the Charles River. This structure is part of the Central Artery/Tunnel Project, informally called "The Big Dig". During his tenure at this project, he mainly focused in improving the appearance of the highways and bridges as part of the project that helped transformed downtown Boston by removing an elevated highway and by opening access to the harbor.

In 1997, he started his own independent architecture and engineering professional practice, Rosales + Partners, in Boston. He was involved in the design of three bridge projects: Liberty Bridge at Falls Park on the Reedy in Greenville, South Carolina, completed in 2004, Puente Centenario, over the Panama Canal, Panama, completed in 2004 and Woodrow Wilson Memorial Bridge over the Potomac River in Washington DC, completed in 2008.  This latter bridge received an award.

Other projects include the Phyllis J. Tilley Memorial Bridge over the Trinity River in Fort Worth, Texas, completed in 2012, the Christina and John Markey Memorial Pedestrian Bridge, completed in 2013, the Moody Pedestrian Bridge, completed in 2016 in Austin Texas and the Frances Appleton Pedestrian Bridge and Longfellow Bridge Restoration completed in 2018 in Boston, Massachusetts.

Rosales lives on Mount Vernon Street in the historic Beacon Hill neighborhood of Boston.

Completed projects
Puente Centenario, Panama Canal, Panama
Leonard P. Zakim Bunker Hill Bridge, Boston, MA
Liberty Bridge at Falls Park on the Reedy River, Greenville, SC
George Washington Carver Bridge, Des Moines, IA
I-235 Pedestrian Bridges, Des Moines, IA
Edna M. Griffin Memorial Bridge
40th Street Pedestrian Bridge
44th Street Pedestrian Bridge
East Locust Street Streetscape Improvements, Des Moines, IA
Woodrow Wilson Memorial Bridge and Maryland Interchange, Washington, DC
Port Columbus Airport Crossover Taxiway Bridge, Columbus, OH
Phyllis J. Tilley Memorial Bridge, Fort Worth, TX
Christina and John Markey Memorial Pedestrian Bridge, Revere, MA
Moody Pedestrian Bridge, Austin, TX
Frances Appleton Bridge, Boston, MA 
Longfellow Bridge, Boston, MA
Fore River Bridge, Quincy and Weymouth, MA
Como Park Pedestrian Bridge, St. Paul, MN

References

External links
Official website

1961 births
Living people
Bridge engineers
American architects
Guatemalan emigrants to the United States
Universidad Francisco Marroquín alumni
Urban designers
MIT School of Architecture and Planning alumni
People from Beacon Hill, Boston